{{Infobox song
| name       = I Can't Escape from You
| cover      =
| alt        =
| published =  Acuff-Rose Publications, Inc.
| type       = single
| artist     = Hank Williams With His Drifting Cowboys
| album      =
| A-side     = Weary Blues from Waitin'
| released   = 
| format     =
| recorded   =  demo +  overdub<ref>{{Cite web|last=Sexton|first=Paul|date=2021-07-08|title='Weary Blues From Waitin: Even In Death, Hank Williams' Reign Went On|url=https://www.udiscovermusic.com/stories/hank-williams-weary-blues-from-waitin-song/|access-date=2021-09-23|website=uDiscover Music|language=en-US}}</ref>
| studio     =
| venue      =
| genre      = Country
| length     = 
| label      = MGM 11574
| writer     = Hank Williams
| producer   =
| prev_title =
| prev_year  =
| next_title =
| next_year  =
}}

"I Can't Escape from You" is a song written by Hank Williams.  The song was originally recorded as a demo by Williams probably in 1951 but he never recorded it in a studio with a band.  MGM released an overdubbed version in 1953 with backing from the Drifting Cowboys.  The song contains the bitter testimony of a man haunted by the memory of a woman who has "a heart of stone."  Like many of the demos that feature just Williams and his guitar, the original performance is artlessly affecting and displays his spare, haunting lyrics:A jug of wine to numb my mindBut what good does it do?The jug runs dry and still I cryI can't escape from youThese wasted tears are souvenirsOf a love I thought was trueYour memory is chained to meI can't escape from youCover versions
 Ray Price recorded the song for Columbia on July 8, 1952
 Jack Scott cut a version of the song.
 George Jones recorded a version of the song.
 The The also recorded it for their Williams tribute LP Hanky Panky''.

Discography

References

Hank Williams songs
1951 songs
Songs written by Hank Williams